Laurie Greenland (born 18 February 1997) is a British downhill mountain biker. In 2016, he finished second at the UCI Downhill World Championships in Val di Sole, Italy. He also won round 6 of the 2019 UCI Mountain Bike World Cup in Val di Sole, Italy.

Laurie Greenland has raced for Pysclewerx (2009 to 2013), Team Wideopenmountainbike.com (2013), Trek World Racing (2014, 2015), MS Mondraker Team (2016 - 2021), SC Syndicate (joined 2022). He was signed as a RedBull athlete in 2019.

Greenland raced his first UCI Mountain Bike World Cup at Cairns, Australia in 2014.

Notable results include:

UK DH National Champion, Junior (Innerleithen, 2014) 
1st UCI DH World Cup, Junior (Lenzerheide, 2015)
1st UCI DH World Cup, Junior (Windham, 2015)
1st UCI DH World Cup, Junior (Val Di Sole, 2015)
UCI Junior DH World Champion (Vallnord, 2015)
2nd UCI DH World Championships (Val Di Sole, 2016)
2nd UCI DH World Cup (Val Di Sole, 2018)
3rd UCI DH World Cup (Les Gets, 2019)
1st UCI DH World Cup (Val Di Sole, 2019)
2nd Red Bull Hardline (2021)

References

External links

Living people
Downhill mountain bikers
1997 births
British male cyclists